Imitation General is a 1958 black-and-white comedy war film in CinemaScope, directed by George Marshall, produced by William B. Hawks, and starring Glenn Ford, Red Buttons, and Taina Elg. The film, distributed by Metro-Goldwyn-Mayer, is based on a short story of the same name by William Chamberlain.

Plot
In the aftermath of a big battle during World War II, Americans Brigadier General Charles Lane, Master Sergeant Murphy "Murph" Savage, and Corporal Chan Derby are cut off behind enemy lines. The general takes over a farmhouse belonging to annoyed Frenchwoman Simone. Lane determines that there is a gap in the American lines and decides to organize a defense from whatever stragglers he can gather together. Shortly afterwards, however, he is killed saving Murph's life.

The first American soldier to show up, Corporal Terry Sellers, mistakes Murph for Lane, as Murph is holding the general's helmet. This gives Murph an idea. Recalling Lane's assessment that leadership is desperately needed to rally the disorganized troops, Murph masquerades as the general, with Derby and Simone's reluctant help. Murph manages to repulse a couple of attacks spearheaded by German tanks, all the while avoiding Private Orville Hutchmeyer, who knows Murph and holds a grudge against him.

At the end of the engagement, Murph is knocked out by shrapnel, allowing him to "die" and resume his real identity.

Cast
 Glenn Ford as MSgt. Murphy Savage
 Red Buttons as Cpl. Chan Derby
 Taina Elg as Simone
 Dean Jones as Cpl. Terry Sellers
 Kent Smith as Brig. Gen. Charles Lane
 Tige Andrews as Pvt. Orville Hutchmeyer
 John Wilder as Lt. Jeff Clayton
 Ralph Votrian as American Pfc.

Box office
According to MGM records, the film earned $1,915,000 in the US and Canada and $1,250,000 elsewhere, resulting in a profit of $1,095,000.

References

External links
 
 
 
 

1958 films
1950s war comedy films
American black-and-white films
Films directed by George Marshall
Metro-Goldwyn-Mayer films
CinemaScope films
Military humor in film
Western Front of World War II films
American World War II films
Films based on short fiction
American war comedy films
1958 comedy films
1950s English-language films
1950s American films